Indiscretion may refer to:

Books and plays
 Indiscretion (play), an 1800 comedy by Prince Hoare
Indiscretions, English-language version of the 1938 play Les Parents terribles
Indiscretion, a 1990 novel by Anne Mather
Indiscretion, a 2000 novel by Jillian Hunter
Indiscretion, a 2015 novel by Hannah Fielding
 Indiscretions, a 1995 novel by Robyn Donald
The Indiscretion, a 2001 novel by Judith Ivory

Film and TV
Indiscretion (2016 film), an American psychological thriller film
Indiscretion (1917 film), an American silent drama film
"Indiscretion" (Star Trek: Deep Space Nine), a 1995 episode of Star Trek: Deep Space Nine

Music
Indiscretion, a 1959 album by Patti Page
"Indiscretion", a 1983 song by Bill Nelson